is a train station located in Dazaifu, Fukuoka.

Lines 

Nishi-Nippon Railroad
Dazaifu Line

Platforms

Adjacent stations

References

Railway stations in Fukuoka Prefecture
Railway stations in Japan opened in 1902
Buildings and structures in Dazaifu, Fukuoka